Olga Maznichenko (born July 24, 1991) is a Ukrainian basketball player for Montbrison Féminin and the Ukrainian national team.

She participated in the EuroBasket Women 2017.

References

1991 births
Living people
Basketball players at the 2015 European Games
European Games medalists in basketball
European Games silver medalists for Ukraine
People from Myrhorod
Power forwards (basketball)
Ukrainian expatriate basketball people in France
Ukrainian women's basketball players
Sportspeople from Poltava Oblast
21st-century Ukrainian women